Heidi Annemarie Sager (29 September 1939 – 17 May 2004, married name Heidi Beard) was a German-born, Australian sprint canoeist who competed in the early 1960s. At the 1960 Summer Olympics in Rome, she was eliminated in the semifinals in both in the K-1 500 m event and the K-2 500 m event.

References

1939 births
2004 deaths
Australian female canoeists
Canoeists at the 1960 Summer Olympics
Olympic canoeists of Australia
German emigrants to Australia